Edebuk is a village in Eket local government area of Akwa Ibom. It is one of the villages that make up the ''Afaha Clan'' in Eket.

Their language is the Ekid Language.

See also 
 Ebana

References 

Villages in Akwa Ibom